Admiral Mason may refer to:

Charles P. Mason (1891–1971), U.S. Navy vice admiral
James O. Mason (1930–2019), U.S. Public Health Service Commissioned Corps admiral
Lynn Mason (born 1942), Canadian Forces vice admiral
Newton E. Mason (1850–1945), U.S. Navy rear admiral
Thomas Henry Mason (1811–1900), British Royal Navy admiral